Solak is a Polish- and Turkish-language surname. Notable bearers of the surname include:

 Aleja Solak (born 1944), Bosnian former footballer
 Fatih Solak (born 1980), Turkish basketball player
 Nick Solak (born 1995), American baseball player
 Tarik Solak (born 1964), Turkish-Australian kickboxing promoter

See also
 Dominik Solák (born 1997), Czech handballer
 Solak, Armenia
 Šolak (disambiguation)

Polish-language surnames
Turkish-language surnames